Taiping Mountain or Taipingshan is a mountain in Datong Township, Yilan County,
Taiwan. It is one of Taiwan's three major forest recreation areas. At 1,950 meters (6,397 feet) above sea level, Taiping Mountain has nurtured an environment rich in ecological resources.

In Taipingshan National Forest Recreation Area, people go up the Taiping Mountain Virgin Forest Park to ride the Pong Pong Train that runs on a track remodeled from the lumber rail in the old days. One could still see the lumber-cutting facilities and operating tools such as the cable transport, aerial lift, lumber rail and steam-powered timber hoist that have remained. These offer visitors an opportunity to learn about the early forest industry in Taiwan as well as to see the natural landscape in high mountains.

During the Typhoon Megi in 2016, Taipingshan received  rain, the highest in Taiwan.

See also
 List of mountains in Taiwan

References

Landforms of Yilan County, Taiwan
Taipingshan
Tourist attractions in Yilan County, Taiwan
Mountaineering in Taiwan